The Southern Arkansas men's basketball program is the college basketball program that represents Southern Arkansas University, competing in the Great American Conference.  The program began as early as 1911.  Though it has been sporadic, the Muleriders have had successes on the hardwood.

Coaches 
There have been 9 Mulerider Basketball coaches since 1947. The school's all-time winningest coach was W.T. Watson. Watson also lead the Muleriders' to three conference regular season championships. Watson's contributions to SAU as basketball coach and later athletic director lead to the Muleriders home gym to be named the W.T. Watson Athletic Center.

Players

1500 Point Club
Six players have scored more than 1,500 points in their Mulerider careers.

All-Americans
Eight players have been named to an All-American team a total of ten times.

Postseason results

NAIA National Tournament results
Southern Arkansas has appeared in the NAIA National Tournament six times. Their combined record is 2–6.

Arena 
The W.T. Watson Center, a 2,500-seat multipurpose arena, is home to the SAU men's and women's basketball teams, as well as the SAU volleyball team.

References

External links
 

Basket